A personal assistant, also referred to as personal aide (PA) or personal secretary (PS), is a job title describing a person who assists a specific person with their daily business or personal task. It is a sub-specialty of secretarial duties.

Duties, responsibilities and functions 
An assistant helps with time and daily management, of meetings, correspondence, and note-taking. The role of a personal assistant can be varied, such as answering phone calls, taking notes, scheduling meetings, emailing, texts, etc.

In business or personal contexts, assistants are people who provide services that relieve his or her employer from the stress of tasks that are associated with managing one's personal and/or business life. They assist with a variety of life management tasks, including running errands, arranging travel (e.g., travel agent services such as purchasing airline tickets, reserving hotel rooms and rental cars, and arranging activities, as well as handling more localized services such as recommending a different route to work based on road or travel conditions), finance (paying bills, buying and selling stocks), and shopping (meal planning, remembering special occasions like birthdays).

An Assistant often acts as the manager's first point of contact with people from both inside and outside the organization. This means that his/her tasks and skills can often be divided into two fields: technical skills, and personal skills.

Tasks may include but are not limited to:
 devising and maintaining office systems, including data management and filing;
 arranging travel, visas and accommodation and, occasionally, traveling with the manager to take notes or dictation at meetings or to provide general assistance during presentations;
 screening phone calls, inquiries and requests, and handling them when appropriate;
 meeting and greeting visitors at all levels of seniority;
 organizing and maintaining diaries and making appointments;
 dealing with incoming email, faxes and post, often corresponding on behalf of the manager;
 taking dictation and minutes;
 carrying out background research and presenting findings;
 producing documents, briefing papers, reports and presentations;
 organizing and attending meetings and ensuring the manager is well prepared for meetings;
 liaising with clients, suppliers and other staff.

In addition to supporting managers, their team and departments, many PA's also have their own personal workload and responsibilities. The scope of the PA's role can be extensive and additional duties may include:

 carrying out specific projects and research;
 responsibility for accounts and budgets;
 taking on some of the manager's responsibilities and working more closely with management; 
 deputizing for the manager, making decisions and delegating work to others in the manager's absence;
 being involved in decision-making processes.

See also
 Au pair
 Manager (disambiguation), title of some similar professions, especially in politics and entertainment
 Body man, U.S. political jargon for a personal assistant to a politician or political candidate

References

Office and administrative support occupations
Assistance